Roman Catholic Archdiocese of Kingston may refer to:

 Roman Catholic Archdiocese of Kingston, Canada
 Roman Catholic Archdiocese of Kingston, Jamaica

See also 
 Roman Catholic Diocese of Kingstown